Melinda Doring is an Australian production designer and former costume designer.  She has won the AACTA Award for Best Production Design four times and been nominated twice more.

Career 
In reviews of Home Song Stories (2007), Variety called the production "ace", and The Hollywood Reporter described it as "first-rate".  In an otherwise mixed review, The Sydney Morning Herald praised Doring's production design in Triangle (2009).  The Hollywood Reporter wrote that her production design in The Eye of the Storm "evokes a world of chauffeured Bentleys and kangaroo-fur stoles inhabited by a wannabe colonial aristocracy".

Awards 

Prior to 2012, the AACTA Awards were known as the AFI Awards.

Filmography

References

External links 
 
 Interview at Inside Film

Living people
Australian filmmakers
Australian production designers
Best Production Design AACTA Award winners
Year of birth missing (living people)